Barb or the BARBs or variation may refer to:

People
 Barb (name), a list of people and fictional characters with the given name or surname
 Barb, a term used by fans of Nicki Minaj to refer to themselves
 The Barbs, a band

Places
 Barb, Ontario, Canada
 DeKalb, Illinois, USA; nicknamed Barb City

Animals
 Barb (feather), the branches issuing from the rachis of feathers
 Barb (fish), common name for a range of freshwater fish
 Barb horse, a breed from North Africa
 Barb (pigeon), a breed of domestic pigeon
 Australian Kelpie or barb, a breed of dog 
 The Barb (1863–1888), Australian Thoroughbred racehorse

Implements
 Barding or barb, a type of armor for horses
 A backward-facing point on a fish hook or similar implement, rendering extraction from the victim's flesh more difficult
 A type of pipe fitting called barb, used to connect hosing (the ridges face backward, making insertion easy and removal difficult)
 Barb, a shortened version of barbiturate, a drug that acts as a depressant for the central nervous system

Other uses
 , two US Navy submarines
 Wind barbs for each station on a map of reported weather conditions
 Broadcasters' Audience Research Board, which compiles television ratings in the United Kingdom
 Berkeley Barb or The Barb, an underground newspaper of the late 1960s

See also
 Barb wire (disambiguation)
 Barbes (disambiguation)
 Barbe (disambiguation)
 Sainte-Barbe (disambiguation)
 Barbara (disambiguation)